is a turn-based, tactical role-playing video game by American developer Hijinx Studios for PlayStation Network and Xbox Live Arcade with a release date of January 20, 2010.

Gameplay
Flames of Judgment is a turn-based, tactical role-playing game, where players engage their band of warriors in turn-based combat on a three-dimensional isometric grid against an opposing force. Each character performs an action each turn where he can move, then use a weapon, item or magical ability. Every action increases the character's skill, slowly leveling up overall as the player progresses through the main story.

Reception
IGN gave Flames of Judgment a 7.3, praising the traditional gameplay while criticizing the graphics and art design.

References

2010 video games
Fantasy video games
Konami games
PlayStation Network games
Tactical role-playing video games
Video game prequels
Video games developed in the United States
Xbox 360 Live Arcade games
Single-player video games